Arsita  is a medieval town and comune in Province of Teramo in the Abruzzo region of eastern Italy. It was called Bacucco until 1905. It is located in Gran Sasso e Monti della Laga National Park.

Geography
Arsita is a communal capital in the Province of Teramo in the Abruzzo Region of Italy.

In the early 19th century the waters from a spring in this area were said to have healing powers.

Events
Each year on the 17th of January, the residents of Arsita, in collaboration with the towns of Cermignano, Tossicia, and Bisenti celebrate the Feast of Saint Antonio Abate.  Another festival features the townsfolk dressed up in costumes representing the 12 months of the year.

References

Cities and towns in Abruzzo